Umm Khalid, also called Mukhalid, was a Palestinian village in the Tulkarm Subdistrict,  west of Tulkarm. It was an ancient site in the central coastline of what is now the city of Netanya, Israel.

History

Archaeological findings around the village included the remains of towers, fortresses, wells, reservoirs, cisterns, and pottery.

Flint tools found around the area suggest that the site might have been inhabited since prehistoric times. 

First century BCE remnants of buildings, installations and burial caves have been found.

Crusader castle
The village site contained Castellum Rogerii Langobardi, the castle of Roger the Lombard, built by the Crusaders. The building was mentioned in 1135, mostly destroyed c. 1948, and partly excavated in 1985/86. It appears to have been continuously in use from the Crusader period until 1948.

Ottoman period
The village was named Omm Kaled on a 1799 map of the area, and the village was razed by the troops of Napoleon during their return to Egypt after their failed siege of Acre in 1799. 

The British traveller James Silk Buckingham, who passed through the village ("El Mukalid") in 1816, described it as still "rather poor", while noting that the village resembled an Egyptian one in form and constructions of its huts.

In the 19th century, Umm Khalid was a rest area between al-Tantura and Ras al-Ayn, where Ottoman officials stopped and received dignitaries. When Mary Rogers, the sister of the British vice-consul in Haifa, visited the Umm Khalid in 1856 she described it as a flourishing village, and noted the extensive melon gardens to the west of the village.

In 1863, Victor Guérin found the village to have about 300 inhabitants. In 1873, among the ruins were seen a vaulted building with remnants of a second story, a well built well, and six circular rock-cut granaries.

In 1882, the PEF's Survey of Western Palestine (SWP) described the village as "A small mud village, with ruins, and a sacred place to the south. On the east is a good masonry well, with troughs and a wheel for raising the water. ... There are also cisterns, and a pond with mud banks. There are cornfields to the east, but the soil is very sandy. The place is famous for its water melons, which are shipped at the little harbour called Minet Abu Zabura."

British Mandate period
In the 1922 census of Palestine there were 307 villagers, all Muslim, increasing in the 1931 census to 586; 580 Muslims and 6 Christians, in a total of 131 houses.

At the village center was a mosque, an elementary school for boys, and four shops for groceries and fabrics. In the 1944/45 statistics, Um Khalid had 970 inhabitants; 960 Muslims and 10 Christians, with a total of 2,894 dunums of land. Of this, a total of 47 dunums were used for citrus and bananas, while 1,830 dunums were planted with cereals. At the same time, it was registered that 2,894 dunums of land was Arab owned, 882 Jewish owned, while 89 dunam was public property.

1948 and after

According to an Israeli military report, Umm Khalid was evacuated 20 March 1948. The village was located in an area which was regarded by the Zionist leadership as the core of the planned Jewish state, and in their view it was therefore desirable that the Arab residents were made to leave before 15 May.

The American historian Rosemarie Esber interviewed refugees from Umm Khalid. According to Ahamed 'Uthman, Zionist surrounded and blockaded the village in 1947, and continued into 1948:

Much of the village land has been engulfed by the suburbs of the city of Netanya, founded in 1929 one kilometer to the west. The settlement of Gan Chefer, founded in 1940, and Nira, founded in 1941, were merged in 1953 to form a single, large settlement named Sha'ar Hefer; this settlement covers part of the village land.

According to the Palestinian historian Walid Khalidi, the structures on the village land were in 1992: "The village site has become part of the city of Netanya. Some houses remain and are used either as residences or for commercial purposes such as warehouses for Israeli companies. The land in the vicinity are planted in citrus trees.

In 1997, bulldozers leveling ground for a school building in Netanya uncovered remains of the cemetery of Umm Khalid. The Aqsa Association for the Preservation of Consecrated Islamic Property petitioned the High Court of Justice. As a result, the city of Netanya agreed to halt work in the area which had not been damaged, and to put up a sign: "Here is the Muslim cemetery of the village Umm Khalid." The Muslims refused to accept that the area should be turned into a park, stating that "No foot shall tread on the graves."

References

Bibliography

External links
Palestine Remembered - Umm-Khalid
Umm Khalid, Zochrot
Survey of Western Palestine, Map 10: IAA, Wikimedia commons
Umm Khalid from the Khalil Sakakini Cultural Center

Arab villages depopulated prior to the 1948 Arab–Israeli War
District of Tulkarm
Crusader castles